Squads of the participating teams at the 2010 Supertaça Compal:

SL Benfica - (1)
Head coach:  Henrique Vieira

Primeiro de Agosto - (2)
Head coach:  Luís Magalhães

Petro Atlético - (3)
Head coach:  Alberto Babo

Ovarense - (4)
Head coach:  Mário Leite

External links
Interbasket Forum Page

References

Supertaça Compal squads